NGC 464 is a double star located in the Andromeda constellation. It was discovered in 1882 by Wilhelm Tempel.

References

External links 
 

Andromeda (constellation)
0464
Double stars